The Greater Western Sydney Giants' 2015 season was its 4th season in the Australian Football League (AFL).

Club summary
The 2015 AFL season was the 119th season of the VFL/AFL competition since its inception in 1897; having entered the competition in 2012, it was the 4th season contested by the Greater Western Sydney Giants. Spotless Stadium once again acted as the club's primary home ground, hosting eight of the club's eleven home games, with three games played at their secondary home ground, StarTrack Oval in Canberra.

Because Spotless Stadium was unavailable for the first five rounds of the regular season due to its required use by the Sydney Royal Easter Show, the club played its first two home games in Canberra, while the first of the two annual Sydney Derbies against the Sydney Swans were played at the Sydney Cricket Ground in Round 3, with the Giants hosting the return fixture in Round 21.

Major sponsors Virgin Australia and Lifebroker continued as the club's two major sponsors, while BLK will manufacture the club's on-and-off field apparel for the next five seasons starting in 2015.

Senior Personnel
Leon Cameron continued as the club's head coach for the second consecutive season, while Callan Ward and Phil Davis  continued as the club's co-captains for the fourth consecutive season. Both have held their respective positions since 2014 and 2012, respectively.

2015 player squad

Playing list changes
The Giants underwent an overhaul of their playing list during the off-season, bringing in experienced players Joel Patfull and Ryan Griffen from the Brisbane Lions and Western Bulldogs, respectively, during the trade period.

The following summarises all player changes between the conclusion of the 2014 season and the commencement of the 2015 season.

In

Out

Season summary

Pre-season matches
The club played three practice matches as part of the 2015 NAB Challenge, which were played under modified pre-season rules, including nine-point goals.

Premiership Season

Home and away season

Ladder

Awards, Records & Milestones

Awards
Round 2:
Prime Minister's Cup (AFL)

Records
As 2015 was Greater Western Sydney's best season since the club was admitted to the competition, a large range of records and milestones were met and broken during the season:
Round 1:
Greater Western Sydney's third consecutive away win
Round 2:
Greater Western Sydney's third consecutive win (club record)
Highest score in any quarter: 9.2 (56) in the third quarter
Highest score in any half: 13.5 (83) in the second half
Biggest turnaround in a premiership match (78 points; were 33 points down in the second quarter, went on to win by 45)
Round 4:
Highest ladder placing after a completed round: 2nd
Round 6:
Greater Western Sydney's first win against a defending premier
Equal most goals kicked in a match by a Giants player: Jeremy Cameron (7.0, also kicked that many against  in Round 18, 2013)
Most goals kicked by in a match by a Giants player at Sydney Showground Stadium: Jeremy Cameron (7.0)
Round 7:
Greater Western Sydney's greatest winning margin (78 points)
Greater Western Sydney's highest ever score (19.21 (135))
Round 8:
Greater Western Sydney's best ever first quarter score (6.4 (40))
Round 10:
Greater Western Sydney's win over the Brisbane Lions was their seventh victory for the season, thus breaking the record for most wins in a single season.

Milestones
Round 1:
Ryan Griffen – First game for Greater Western Sydney
Joel Patfull – First game for Greater Western Sydney
Tomas Bugg – 50th AFL game
Dylan Shiel – 50th AFL game
Round 4:
Rhys Palmer – 100th AFL game
Round 6:
Stephen Coniglio – 50th AFL game
Round 9:
Heath Shaw – 200th AFL game
Round 12:
Caleb Marchbank – AFL debut
Jack Steele – AFL debut
Round 16:
Curtly Hampton – 50th AFL game
Tom Scully – 100th AFL game
Round 17:
Adam Tomlinson – 50th AFL game

Brownlow Medal

Results

Brownlow Medal tally

 italics denotes ineligible player

Tribunal cases

Notes
"Points" refers to carry-over points accrued following the sanction. For example, 154.69 points draw a one-match suspension, with 54.69 carry-over points (for every 100 points, a one-match suspension is given).

References

Greater Western Sydney Giants Season, 2015
Greater Western Sydney Giants seasons